"Ehtesaab" (Urdu: احتساب, literal English translation: "accountability") is the second track on the 1995 compilation album Kashmakash by the sufi rock band Junoon, and is the second single from the album. After the release of the band's first real big hit single "Jazba-e-Junoon", which was the song of the 1996 Cricket World Cup. "Ehtesaab" was their second hit and was released in December 1996. The video of the single was directed by Pakistani director, Shoaib Mansoor.

The controversial video release of the song mocked Pakistani politics and led to the video of the song being banned from PTV, Pakistan's State television. The video of the single also featured in BBC film The Princess and the Playboy, an exposé on Benazir's and her husband's reign. In Newsweek, Carla Power dedicated a full-page story to Junoon with the headline "For God and Country."

Music video
The blunt, hard-hitting "Ehtesaab" video shows Pakistani children working backbreaking menial jobs, juxtaposed with fictional politicians gorging themselves at five-star hotels. It also includes a scene in which a horse is dining at a luxury hotel (a deliberated reference to polo ponies kept by Asif Zardari). Those mares ate better than many of Pakistan's poor. In air conditioned stables, no less.

Controversies
Junoon were courted for the controversial video release of the single which included footage of a polo pony eating in a posh restaurant by the Pakistani government. Many thought that the image was an indictment of the corrupt Pakistani political elite, and especially of former Prime Minister Benazir Bhutto. The government quickly responded to it and banned the song and video from the state television.

In 1997, Junoon went on their first Indian tour. The band's first concert was held in New Delhi, India. After travelling throughout the country, Junoon saw crowds of as many as of 50,000 fans at different venues. The band was courted for a controversy during their tour to India by the Pakistani government. The Indian government was testing nuclear devices at that time, and Salman Ahmad suggested that the Indian and Pakistani leaders should spend more on education and health and less on weapons. This led to a prolonged ban on Junoon's music by the Pakistani government. PTV, the Pakistan state television, refused to show the audience even clips from Junoon releases. The Ministry of Culture charged Junoon with making comments in India amounting to sedition and treason. The band members denied these charges reminding people of the fact that they had been victimised since the release of "Ehtesaab" because they chose to speak out against political corruption.

Track listing
Ehtesaab

Personnel

Junoon
Ali Azmat - lead vocals, backing vocals
Salman Ahmad - backing vocals, lead guitar
Brian O'Connell - bass guitar, backing vocals

Additional musicians
Backing vocals by Najam Sheraz

Published sources
 Salman Ahmad (2010), Rock & Roll Jihad: A Muslim Rock Star’s Revolution for Peace, Free Press. .

References

External links
 Junoon Official Website
 Ehtesaab Official Lyrics

1996 singles
Junoon (band) songs
Songs written by Salman Ahmad
1995 songs
EMI Records singles